The 21st Expeditionary Reconnaissance Squadron is a provisional United States Air Force unit, assigned to United States Air Forces Europe to activate or inactivate as needed. Its last known location was at Souda Bay, Greece.

The squadron was active as the 21st Tactical Reconnaissance Squadron, and served as a reconnaissance Replacement Training Unit during World War II until being disbanded in a reorganization of the United States Army Air Forces designed to make the most efficient use of resources to free manpower for overseas assignment.

The 1st Tactical Reconnaissance Squadron was formed shortly after the end of the war and served as part of the occupation forces in Germany until 1947, when it returned to the United States, where it was inactivated in 1949. The squadron was reactivated in 1952 to replace the 160th Tactical Reconnaissance Squadron, an Alabama Air National Guard unit.  It remained in Europe as an element of the 10th Tactical Reconnaissance Wing (later 10th Tactical Fighter Wing) until it was inactivated on 15 January 1988.

The two squadrons were consolidated in 1985.  In 2007, the consolidated squadron was converted to provisional status as the 21st Expeditionary Reconnaissance Squadron and assigned to United States Air Forces Europe, which activated it at Souda Bay, Greece.

History

World War II
The squadron was first established during World War II as the 21st Tactical Reconnaissance Squadron and served as a Replacement Training Unit (RTU). RTUs were oversized units whose mission was to train individual pilots or aircrews. The squadron was stationed at several airfields in the Midwest and Southeast as part of Third Air Force. It initially trained crews for medium bombers used as reconnaissance aircraft, but changed its mission to focus on training reconnaissance pilots for overseas duty.

However, the United States Army Air Forces found that standard military units, based on relatively inflexible tables of organization, were less well adapted to the training mission.  Accordingly, it adopted a more functional system in which each base was organized into a separate numbered unit. As a result, the squadron was disbanded in 1944 and replaced by the 347th AAF Base Unit (Replacement Training Unit, Tactical Reconnaissance).

Occupation of Germany and Post War
The 1st Tactical Reconnaissance Squadron was organized after the end of the war and served in the occupation of Germany It was equipped with a variety of transport aircraft (C-45, C-47, UC-64) until it moved to Fürth Air Base, Germany where it began transition to North American P-51 Mustangs.

The squadron moved to the United States and became part of Tactical Air Command in 1947 at Langley Field, Virginia, then moved to Lawson Field, Georgia without personnel or equipment near Fort Benning where it equipped with F-6D (later RF-51D) Mustangs.  The unit moved to Pope Field, North Carolina in September.  It flew aerial mapping and reconnaissance missions, largely over the mid-Atlantic region, supporting Army forces at Fort Bragg during maneuvers. It was inactivated in 1949 due to budget restrictions.

Cold War Service With United States Air Forces Europe
The squadron was reactivated as a night Tactical Reconnaissance Squadron in France in 1952 to replace an Alabama Air National Guard tactical reconnaissance squadron which had been federalized and brought to active duty in the buildup of forces during the Korean War.  The RB-26s were repainted black and the squadron was assigned a night reconnaissance mission supporting United States Army and North Atlantic Treaty Organization ground forces in West Germany.

In May 1953 the squadron moved to Spangdahlem Air Base, West Germany as part of a United States Air Forces Europe reorganization.  The World War II-era RB-26s began to be replaced in October 1954 by Martin RB-57A Canberras, again painted black for night reconnaissance missions, although some Invaders remained through 1956.  In 1957 the RB-57s were transferred to Châteauroux-Déols Air Depot for shipment back to the United States and the 1st TRS was re-equipped with the Douglas RB-66C Destroyer.

The squadron moved to RAF Alconbury, England in 1959 when the 47th Bombardment Wing's B-45s were retired, and Spangdalem became a tactical fighter base.  It continued operating the RB-66Cs for night reconnaissance, although rotated frequently to Toul Air Base until 1966 where its parent 10th TRW operated a forward location. In 1966 it converted to the RF-4C Phantom II upon its introduction to USAFE.  The squadron flew the RF-4C for over 20 years from Alconbury, and from RAF Wethersfield, frequently participating in NATO exercises.

The unit was consolidated with the 21st Tactical Reconnaissance Squadron in 1985 to give the squadron a World War II history. The squadron became non-operational on 16 June 1987 with the withdrawal of the RF-4C from Europe, and was inactivated in 1988 when the 10th TRW transitioned to a Fairchild Republic A-10 tactical fighter wing.

Lineage
21st Tactical Reconnaissance Squadron
 Constituted as 21st Observation Squadron (Light) on 5 February 1942
 Activated on 2 March 1942
 Redesignated  21st Observation Squadron on 4 July 1942
 Redesignated 21st Reconnaissance Squadron (Bomber) on 2 April 1943
 Redesignated 21st Tactical Reconnaissance Squadron on 11 August 1943
 Disbanded on 1 May 1944.
 Reconstituted on 19 September 1985 and consolidated with the 1st Tactical Reconnaissance Squadron as the 1st Tactical Reconnaissance Squadron on 21 Sep 1985

21st Expeditionary Reconnaissance Squadron
 Constituted 5 November 1945 as 1st Tactical Reconnaissance Squadron
 Activated 6 December 1945
 Inactivated on 1 Apr 1949
 Redesignated 1st Tactical Reconnaissance Squadron, Night-Photographic, 25 June 1952
 Activated on 10 July 1952
 Redesignated 1st Tactical Reconnaissance Squadron, Night, Photo-Jet on 1 May 1959
 Redesignated 1st Tactical Reconnaissance Squadron on 1 October 1966
 Consolidated with the 21st Tactical Reconnaissance Squadron on 19 September 1985
 Inactivated on 15 Jan 1988
 Redesignated 21st Expeditionary Reconnaissance Squadron and converted to provisional status on 10 August 2007
 Activated on 8 October 2007
 Inactivated c. 9 September 2008

Assignments
 Air Force Combat Command (later Army Air Forces), 2 Mar 1942
 75th Observation (later Reconnaissance; Tactical Reconnaissance) Group, 12 March 1942 – 1 May 1944.
 10th Tactical Reconnaissance Group, 14 December 1945 – 1 April 1949
 10th Tactical Reconnaissance Group, 10 July 1952
 10th Tactical Reconnaissance Wing (later 10th Tactical Fighter Wing), 8 December 1957 – 15 January 1988
 United States Air Forces Europe to activate or inactivate anytime after 10 August 2007
 401st Air Expeditionary Group, 8 October 2007
 100th Operations Group (attached), 9 September 2008

Stations

 Langley Field, Virginia, 2 March 1942
 Kellogg Field, Michigan, 9 March 1942
 Will Rogers Field, Oklahoma, 30 August 1942
 William Northern Field, Tennessee, 12 March 1943
 Key Field, Mississippi, 19 August 1943 – 1 May 1944
 Criel, France, 14 December 1945
 Istres-Le Tubé Air Base, France, 13 January 1946
 Compiègne, France, 30 March 1946
 Fürth Air Base, Germany, 12 September 1946 – ca. 20 June 1947
 Langley Field, Virginia, 25 June 1947

 Lawson Field, Georgia, 8 September 1947
 Pope Field (later Pope Air Force Base), North Carolina, 27 September 1947 – 1 April 1949
 Toul Rosieres AB, France, 1 July 1952
 Spangdahlem Air Base, West Germany, 10 May 1953
 RAF Alconbury, England, 26 August 1959 – 15 January 1988
 Souda Bay, Greece, 8 October 2007 – c. 9 September 2008

Aircraft

 L-4 and evidently 0-47, 1942, 1943
 Douglas A-20 Havoc, 1942–1943
 North American B-25 Mitchell, 1942–1943
 Bell P-39 Airacobra 1942–1943, 1943–1944
 Curtiss P-40 Warhawk 1942–1943, 1943–1944
 Noorduyn UC-64 Norseman, 1945–1946
 Beech C-45 Expeditor, 1945–1946
 Douglas C-47 Skytrain, 1945–1946
 F-6D/RF-51D Mustang, 1942–1943, 1943–1944, 1946–1947, 1947–1949

 Douglas RB-26 Invader, 1952–1954
 Martin RB-57 Canberra, 1954–1957
 Douglas RB-66C Destroyer, 1957–1966
 McDonnell Douglas RF-4C Phantom II, 1966–1988

References

Notes
Explanatory notes

Footnotes

Bibliography

 
 
 
 

021
Air expeditionary squadrons of the United States Air Force